This is a list of military divisions of all nationalities organised by number. Divisions may be infantry, airborne, cavalry, mechanized, armoured or aviation.

1st to 5th 

 1st Division 
 Australian 1st Division
 Australian 1st Armoured Division
 Brazilian 1st Division
 British 1st Cavalry Division
 British 1st Mounted Division
 British 1st Armoured Division
 British 1st Airborne Division
 British 1st Commonwealth Division
 British 1st Division
 1st Canadian Division
 Chinese 1st Fighter Division
 1st Royal Bavarian Division
 1st Bavarian Landwehr Division
 1st Bavarian Reserve Division
 Imperial German 1st Cavalry Division
 Imperial German 1st Division
 Imperial German 1st Guards Division
 Imperial German 1st Guards Reserve Division
 Imperial German 1st Landwehr Division
 Imperial German 1st Naval Division
 Imperial German 1st Reserve Division
 German Hermann Göring Parachute Panzer Division 1 (previously Hermann Göring Division, Hermann Göring Panzer Division)
 German 1st Infantry Division
 German 1st Luftwaffe Field Division
 German 1st Panzer Division
 German 1st Parachute Division (previously 7th Flieger (Air) Division)
 German 1st Waffen-SS Panzer Leibstandarte SS Adolf Hitler Division
 Greek 1st Infantry Division
 1st (Peshawar) Division of the British Indian Army before and during the First World War
 1st Indian Cavalry Division of the British Indian Army during the First World War
 Italian 1st Alpine Division
 Italian 1st Blackshirt Armoured Division
 Italian 1st Blackshirt Division
 Italian 1st Cavalry Division
 Italian 1st Libyan Colonial Division
 Italian 1st Mountain Infantry Division
 Japanese 1st Division
 North Korean 1st Division
 Philippine 1st Infantry Division
 Polish 1st Legions Infantry Division
 Polish 1st Lithuanian-Belarusian Division
 Polish 1st Armoured Division
 Polish 1st Grenadiers Division
 South African 1st Infantry Division
 Spanish 1st Mechanized Infantry Division "Brunete"
 U.S. 1st Armored Division
 U.S. 1st Cavalry Division
 U.S. 1st Infantry Division
 U.S. 1st Marine Division

 2nd Division 
 Australian 2nd Division
 British 2nd Cavalry Division
 British 2nd Armoured Division
 British 2nd Infantry Division
 British 2nd Mounted Division
 British 2nd (African) Division
 2nd Canadian Division
 2nd Royal Bavarian Division
 2nd Bavarian Landwehr Division
 Imperial German 2nd Cavalry Division
 Imperial German 2nd Division
 Imperial German 2nd Guards Division
 Imperial German 2nd Guards Reserve Division
 Imperial German 2nd Landwehr Division
 Imperial German 2nd Naval Division
 German 2nd Luftwaffe Field Division
 German 2nd Naval Infantry Division
 German 2nd Parachute Division
 Greek 2nd Mechanized Infantry Division
 2nd (Rawalpindi) Division of the British Indian Army before and during the First World War
 2nd Indian Cavalry Division of the British Indian Army during the First World War
 Indian 2nd Infantry Division
 Italian 2nd Alpine Division
 Italian 2nd Blackshirt Division
 Italian 2nd Cavalry Division
 Italian 2nd Libyan Division
 Italian 2nd Mountain Infantry Division
 Japanese 2nd Division
 New Zealand 2nd Division
 North Korean 2nd Division
 Philippine 2nd Infantry Division
 Polish 2nd Legions Infantry Division
 Russian 2nd Guards Tamanskaya Motor Rifle Division
 South African 2nd Infantry Division
 Soviet 2nd Rifle Division
 U.S. 2nd Air Division
 U.S. 2nd Armored Division
 U.S. 2nd Cavalry Division
 U.S. 2nd Infantry Division
 U.S. 2nd Marine Division

 3rd Division 
 Australian 3rd Division
 British 3rd Infantry Division
 British 3rd Mounted Division
 British 3rd Cavalry Division
 3rd Canadian Division
 Chinese 3rd Fighter Division
 3rd Royal Bavarian Division
 Imperial German 3rd Cavalry Division
 Imperial German 3rd Division
 Imperial German 3rd Guards Division
 Imperial German 3rd Landwehr Division
 Imperial German 3rd Naval Division
 Imperial German 3rd Reserve Division
 German 3rd Luftwaffe Field Division
 German Parachute Division 3
 3rd (Lahore) Division of the British Indian Army before and during the First World War
 3rd Lahore Divisional Area of the British Indian Army during the First World War
 3rd Indian Infantry Division – official designation for the Chindits
 Italian 3rd Alpine Division
 Italian 3rd Blackshirt Division
 Italian 3rd Cavalry Division
 Italian 3rd Mountain Infantry Division
 Japanese 3rd Division
 North Korean 3rd Division
 Philippine 3rd Infantry Division
 Polish 3rd Legions Infantry Division
 Polish 3rd Carpathian Infantry Division
 South African 3rd Infantry Division
 U.S. 3rd Armored Division
 U.S. 3rd Infantry Division
 U.S. 3rd Marine Division
 3rd Division (Vietnam)

 4th Division 
 Australian 4th Division
 British 4th Cavalry Division
 British 4th Infantry Division
 British 4th Mounted Division
 4th Canadian Division (also 4th Canadian (Armoured) Division)
 Chinese 4th Fighter Division
 4th Royal Bavarian Division
 Imperial German 4th Cavalry Division
 Imperial German 4th Division
 Imperial German 4th Ersatz Division
 Imperial German 4th Guards Division
 Imperial German 4th Landwehr Division
 German 4th Luftwaffe Field Division
 German 4th Parachute Division
 4th (Quetta) Division of the British Indian Army before and during the First World War
 4th Cavalry Division (India) of the British Indian Army during the First World War
 Indian 4th Infantry Division
 Italian 4th Alpine Division
 Italian 4th Blackshirt Division
 Italian 4th Mountain Infantry Division
 Japanese 4th Division
 North Korean 4th Division
 Philippine 4th Infantry Division
 Russian 4th Guards Kantemirovskaya Tank Division
 U.S. 4th Air Division
 U.S. 4th Armored Division
 U.S. 4th Infantry Division
 U.S. 4th Marine Division

 5th Division 
 Australian 5th Division
 British 5th Infantry Division
 5th Canadian Division (also 5th Canadian (Armoured) Division)
 French 5th Light Cavalry Division
 French 5th Motorized Division
 French 5th North African Infantry Division
 5th Royal Bavarian Division
 5th Bavarian Reserve Division
 Imperial German 5th Cavalry Division
 Imperial German 5th Division
 Imperial German 5th Ersatz Division
 Imperial German 5th Guards Division
 Imperial German 5th Landwehr Division
 Imperial German 5th Reserve Division
 German 5th Luftwaffe Field Division
 German 5th Mountain Division
 German 5th Panzer Division
 German 5th Parachute Division
 Greek 5th Infantry Division
 5th (Mhow) Division of the British Indian Army before and during the First World War
 5th Cavalry Division (India) of the British Indian Army during the First World War
 Indian 5th Infantry Division
 Italian 5th Alpine Division
 Italian 5th Infantry Division
 Japanese 5th Division
 North Korean 5th Division
 Philippine 5th Infantry Division
 Polish 5th Siberian Rifle Division
 Polish 5th Infantry Division
 Soviet 5th Rifle Division
 U.S. 5th Air Division
 U.S. 5th Armored Division
 U.S. 5th Infantry Division
 U.S. 5th Marine Division
 5th Infantry Division (Vietnam People's Army)

6th to 10th 

 6th Division 
 Australian 6th Division
 British 6th Airborne Division
 British 6th Armoured Division
 British 6th Infantry Division (World War I and II)
 6th Canadian Infantry Division
 Finnish 6th Division (Winter War)
 Finnish 6th Division (Continuation War)
 French 6th Light Armored Division
 6th Royal Bavarian Division
 6th Bavarian Landwehr Division
 6th Bavarian Reserve Division
 Imperial German 6th Cavalry Division
 Imperial German 6th Division
 Imperial German 6th Reserve Division
 German 6th Luftwaffe Field Division
 German 6th Parachute Division
 6th (Poona) Division of the British Indian Army before and during the First World War
 6th Poona Divisional Area of the British Indian Army during the First World War
 Indian 6th Infantry Division
 Italian 6th Alpine Division
 Italian 6th Infantry Division
 Imperial Japanese 6th Division
 North Korean 6th Division
 Norwegian 6th Division
 Philippine 6th Infantry Division
 South African 6th Armoured Division
 U.S. 6th Armored Division
 U.S. 6th Infantry Division
 U.S. 6th Marine Division

 7th Division 
 Australian 7th Division
 British 7th Armoured Division "The Desert Rats"
 British 7th Infantry Division
 Canadian 7th Infantry Division
 Imperial German 7th Cavalry Division
 Imperial German 7th Division
 Imperial German 7th Landwehr Division
 Imperial German 7th Reserve Division
 German 7th Air Division (also 7th Flieger Division)
 German 7th SS Volunteer Mountain Division
 German 7th Luftwaffe Field Division
 German 7th Parachute Division (earlier Erdmann Parachute Division)
 7th (Meerut) Division of the British Indian Army before and during the First World War
 7th Meerut Divisional Area of the British Indian Army during the First World War
 Indian 7th Infantry Division
 Italian 7th Infantry Division
 Japanese 7th Division
 North Korean 7th Division
 Philippine 7th Infantry Division
 U.S. 7th Air Division
 U.S. 7th Armored Division
 U.S .7th Infantry Division
 7th Division (Vietnam)

 8th Division 
 Australian 8th Division
 British 8th Infantry Division (World War I and World War II)
 British 8th Armoured Division
 Canadian 8th Infantry Division
 8th Bavarian Reserve Division
 Imperial German 8th Cavalry Division
 Imperial German 8th Division
 Imperial German 8th Ersatz Division
 Imperial German 8th Landwehr Division
 German 8th Luftwaffe Field Division
 German 8th Parachute Division
 Greek 8th Infantry Division
 8th (Lucknow) Division of the British Indian Army before and during the First World War
 Indian 8th Infantry Division
 Imperial Japanese 8th Division
 Italian 8th Infantry Division
 North Korean 8th Division
 Philippine 8th Infantry Division
 U.S. 8th Armored Division
 U.S. 8th Infantry Division

 9th Division 
 Australian 9th Division
 British 9th (Highland) Infantry Division (World War II)
 British 9th (Scottish) Division
 British 9th Armoured Division
 9th Bavarian Reserve Division
 Imperial German 9th Cavalry Division
 Imperial German 9th Division
 Imperial German 9th Landwehr Division
 Imperial German 9th Reserve Division
 German 9th Luftwaffe Field Division
 German 9th Parachute Division
 9th (Secunderabad) Division of the British Indian Army before and during the First World War
 Indian 9th Infantry Division
 Italian 9th Motorised Division
 Japanese 9th Division
 North Korean 9th Division
 Philippine 9th Infantry Division
 U.S. 9th Armored Division
 U.S. 9th Infantry Division
 9th Division (Vietnam)

 10th Division 
 Australian 10th Division
 British 10th (Irish) Division (First World War)
 British 10th Armoured Division
 French 10th Parachute Division
 10th Bavarian Infantry Division
 Imperial German 10th Division
 Imperial German 10th Ersatz Division
 Imperial German 10th Landwehr Division
 Imperial German 10th Reserve Division
 German 10th Infantry Division 
 German 10th Luftwaffe Field Division
 German 10th Parachute Division
 10th Indian Division of the British Indian Army during the First World War
 Indian 10th Infantry Division
 Japanese 10th Division
 Italian 10th Motorised Division
 North Korean 10th Division
 Philippine 10th Infantry Division
 U.S. 10th Armored Division
 U.S. 10th Mountain Division
 10th Guards Motor Rifle Division (Soviet Army)
 10th Division (Vietnam People's Army)

11th to 20th 

 11th Division 
 Australian 11th Division
 British 11th (Northern) Division
 British 11th Armoured Division
 11th Bavarian Infantry Division
 Imperial German 11th Division
 Imperial German 11th Landwehr Division
 Imperial German 11th Reserve Division
 German 11th Luftwaffe Field Division
 German 11th Parachute Division
 11th Indian Division of the British Indian Army during the First World War
 Indian 11th Infantry Division
 Italian 11th Infantry Division
 Imperial Japanese 11th Division
 U.S. 11th Airborne Division
 U.S. 11th Armored Division
 U.S. 11th Infantry Division
 Yugoslav 11th Air Defense Division

 12th Division 
 Australian 12th Division
 British 12th (Eastern) Division, a formation in the First World War
 British 12th (Eastern) Division, a formation in the Second World War
 12th Bavarian Infantry Division
 Imperial German 12th Division
 Imperial German 12th Landwehr Division
 Imperial German 12th Reserve Division
 German 12th Luftwaffe Field Division
 Greek 12th Mechanized Infantry Division
 12th Indian Division of the British Indian Army during the First World War
 Indian 12th Infantry Division
 Italian 12th Infantry Division
 Imperial Japanese 12th Division
 12th Division (North Korea)
 U.S. 12th Armored Division
 Philippine Division (United States)

 13th Division 
 British 13th (Western) Division
 Imperial German 13th Division
 Imperial German 13th Landwehr Division
 Imperial German 13th Reserve Division
 German 13th Waffen Mountain Division of the SS Handschar (1st Croatian)
 German 13th Luftwaffe Field Division
 Italian 13th Infantry Division
 Imperial Japanese 13th Division
 North Korean 13th Division
 Soviet 13th Guards Cavalry Division
 U.S. 13th Airborne Division
 U.S. 13th Armored Division
 Yugoslav 13th Air Defense Division

 14th Division 
 14th (Light) Division (British Army)
 14th Bavarian Infantry Division
 Imperial German 14th Division
 Imperial German 14th Landwehr Division
 Imperial German 14th Reserve Division
 German 14th Luftwaffe Field Division
 14th Indian Division of the British Indian Army during the First World War
 Indian 14th Infantry Division
 Italian 14th Infantry Division
 U.S. 14th Armored Division

 15th Division 
 British 15th (Scottish) Division
 Chinese 15th Fighter Division
 15th Bavarian Infantry Division
 Imperial German 15th Division
 Imperial German 15th Landwehr Division
 Imperial German 15th Reserve Division
 German 15th Luftwaffe Field Division
 Italian 15th Infantry Division
 15th Division (Imperial Japanese Army)
 North Korean 15th Division
 15th Indian Division of the British Indian Army during the First World War
 Philippine 15th Infantry Division
 Yugoslav 15th Air Defense Division

 16th Division 
 16th (Irish) Division (United Kingdom)
 16th Bavarian Infantry Division
 Imperial German 16th Division
 Imperial German 16th Landwehr Division
 Imperial German 16th Reserve Division
 German 16th Luftwaffe Field Division
 Greek 16th Mechanized Infantry Division
 16th Indian Division of the British Indian Army during the First World War
 Italian 16th Motorised Division
 Polish 16th Infantry Division
 16th Rifle Division (Soviet Union)
 16th Armored Division (United States)

 17th Division 
 British 17th (Northern) Division
 Imperial German 17th Division
 Imperial German 17th Landwehr Division
 Imperial German 17th Reserve Division
 German 17th Luftwaffe Field Division
 17th Indian Division of the British Indian Army during the First World War
 Indian 17th Infantry Division
 Italian 17th Motorised Division
 17th Division (Imperial Japanese Army)
 17th Airborne Division (United States)

 18th Division 
 18th (Eastern) Division (United Kingdom)
 18th Infantry Division (United Kingdom)
 Imperial German 18th Division
 Imperial German 18th Landwehr Division
 Imperial German 18th Reserve Division
 German 18th Luftwaffe Field Division
 18th Indian Division of the British Indian Army during the First World War
 Italian 18th Infantry Division
 18th Division (North Korea)
 18th Division (South Vietnam)
 18th Cavalry Division (Soviet Union)

 19th Division 
 19th (Western) Division (British Army)
 Imperial German 19th Division
 Imperial German 19th Ersatz Division
 Imperial German 19th Landwehr Division
 Imperial German 19th Reserve Division
 German 19th Luftwaffe Field Division (later 19th Luftwaffe Storm Division)
 Indian 19th Infantry Division
 Italian 19th Infantry Division
 North Korean 19th Division
 19th Motor Rifle Division (Soviet Union)
 19th Infantry Division (United States)

 20th Division 
 British 20th (Light) Division
 Imperial German 20th Division
 Imperial German 20th Landwehr Division
 German 20th Luftwaffe Field Division (later 20th Luftwaffe Storm Division)
 German 20th Parachute Division
 Indian 20th Infantry Division
 Italian 20th Infantry Division
 U.S. 20th Armored Division

21st to 30th 

 21st Division 
 British 21st Division
 Imperial German 21st Division
 Imperial German 21st Landwehr Division
 Imperial German 21st Reserve Division
 German 21st Luftwaffe Field Division (formerly the Meindl Division)
 German Parachute Division 21
 German Panzer Division 21
 Indian 21st Infantry Division
 Italian 21st Infantry Division
 21st Mountain Infantry Division (Poland)

 22nd Division
 British 22nd Division
 French 22nd Infantry Division
 Imperial German 22nd Division
 Imperial German 22nd Landwehr Division
 Imperial German 22nd Reserve Division
 German 22nd Panzer Division
 German 22nd Air Landing Division
 German 22nd Luftwaffe Field Division
 Italian 22nd Infantry Division
 Imperial Japanese 22nd Infantry Division
 Polish 22nd Mountain Infantry Division
 U.S. 22nd Cavalry Division

 23rd Division 
 British 23rd Division
 British 23rd (Northumbrian) Division
 Imperial German 23rd Division
 Imperial German 23rd Landwehr Division
 Imperial German 23rd Reserve Division
 German 23rd Infantry Division
 German 23rd Panzer Division
 German 23rd Waffen Mountain Division of the SS Kama
 Italian 23rd Infantry Division
 Imperial Japanese 23rd Infantry Division
 Indian 23rd Infantry Division
 U.S. 23rd Air Division
 U.S. 23rd Cavalry Division
 U.S. 23rd Infantry Division ("Americal Division")

 24th Division 
 British 24th Division
 Chinese 24th Fighter Division
 Imperial German 24th Division
 Imperial German 24th Reserve Division
 German 24th Panzer Division
 Italian 24th Infantry Division
 Imperial Japanese 24th Division
 Soviet 24th Rifle Division
 U.S. 24th Air Division
 U.S. 24th Cavalry Division
 U.S. 24th Infantry Division

 25th Division 
 British 25th Infantry Division
 Imperial German 25th Division
 Imperial German 25th Landwehr Division
 Imperial German 25th Reserve Division
 Imperial Japanese 25th Infantry Division
 Italian 25th Motorised Division
 Soviet 25th Rifle Division
 U.S. 25th Infantry Division

 26th Division 
 Imperial German 26th Division
 Imperial German 26th Landwehr Division
 Imperial German 26th Reserve Division
 German 26th Infantry Division
 Indian 26th Infantry Division
 Italian 26th Mountain Infantry Division
 U.S. 26th Air Division
 U.S. 26th Infantry Division

 27th Division 
 British 27th Division
 Imperial German 27th Division
 German 27th Panzer Division
 Italian 27th Motorised Division
 North Korean 27th Division
 Polish 27th Home Army Infantry Division
 U.S. 27th Infantry Division

 28th Division 
 British 28th Division
 Imperial German 28th Division
 Imperial German 28th Reserve Division
 Italian 28th Infantry Division
 Polish 28th Infantry Division
 U.S. 28th Infantry Division

 29th Division 
 British 29th Division
 Imperial German 29th Division
 German 29th Infantry Division
 German 29th Waffen Grenadier Division of the SS (1st Italian)
 Italian 29th Infantry Division
 U.S. 29th Air Division
 U.S. 29th Infantry Division

 30th Division 
 Imperial German 30th Division
 Imperial German 30th Reserve Division – later 30th Bavarian Reserve Division
 Italian 30th Infantry Division
 British 30th Division
 U.S. 30th Infantry Division

31st to 40th 

 31st Division 
 British 31st Division
 Imperial German 31st Infantry Division
 Imperial Japanese 31st Infantry Division
 Italian 31st Infantry Division
 U.S. 31st Infantry Division
 31st Division (Vietnam People's Army)

 32nd Division 
 British 32nd Division
 French 32nd Infantry Division
 German 32nd Infantry Division
 Imperial German 32nd Infantry Division
 Italian 32nd Infantry Division
 Soviet 32nd Rifle Division
 U.S. 32nd Air Division
 U.S. 32nd Infantry Division

 33rd Division 
 Imperial German 33rd Division
 Imperial German 33rd Reserve Division
 German 33rd Infantry Division
 German 33rd Waffen Grenadier Division of the SS Charlemagne (1st French)
 Indian 33rd Armoured Division
 Italian 33rd Mountain Infantry Division
 Imperial Japanese 33rd Division
 Soviet 33rd Motor Rifle Division
 British 33rd Division
 U.S. 33rd Air Division
 U.S. 33rd Infantry Division

 34th Division 
 British 34th Division
 Imperial German 34th Division
 U.S. 34th Infantry Division

 35th Division
 Imperial German 35th Division
 Imperial German 35th Reserve Division
 German 35th SS and Police Grenadier Division
 British 35th Division
 U.S. 35th Air Division
 U.S. 35th Infantry Division

 36th Division 
 British 36th (Ulster) Division
 British 36th Infantry Division (World War II)
 Imperial German 36th Division
 Imperial German 36th Reserve Division
 Indian 36th Infantry Division
 Israeli 36th Armor Division
 Italian 36th Mountain Infantry Division
 U.S. 36th Infantry Division

 37th Division 
 Imperial German 37th Division
 Imperial Japanese 37th Division
 Italian 37th Mountain Infantry Division
 U.S. 37th Air Division
 U.S. 37th Infantry Division

 38th Division 
 Imperial German 38th Division
 Imperial German 38th Landwehr Division
 British 38th (Welsh) Division
 Italian 38th Infantry Division
 U.S. 38th Air Division
 U.S. 38th Infantry Division

 39th Division 
 British 39th Division
 Imperial German 39th Division
 Imperial German 39th Reserve Division – later 39th Bavarian Reserve Division
 Indian 39th Infantry Division
 U.S. 39th Air Division
 39th Infantry Division (United States)

 40th Division 
 British 40th Infantry Division
 Imperial German 40th Division 
 Imperial Japanese 40th Division
 Italian 40th Infantry Division
 U.S. 40th Air Division
 U.S. 40th Infantry Division

41st to 50th 

 41st Division 
 British 41st Division
 French 41st Infantry Division
 Imperial German 41st Infantry Division
 Imperial Japanese 41st Division
 Italian 41st Infantry Division
 U.S. 41st Air Division
 U.S. 41st Infantry Division

 42nd Division 
 British 42nd (East Lancashire) Division
 British 42nd Armoured Division
 Imperial German 42nd Infantry Division
 U.S. 42nd Infantry Division

 43rd Division 
 British 43rd (Wessex) Infantry Division
 43rd Reserve Division (German Empire)
 North Korean 43rd Division
 U.S. 43rd Infantry Division

 44th Division 
 British 44th (Home Counties) Infantry Division
 Imperial German 44th Landwehr Division
 Imperial German 44th Reserve Division
 German 44th Infantry Division
 Indian 44th Airborne Division
 Italian 44th Infantry Division
 44th Training Airborne Division (Soviet Airborne Forces)
 U.S. 44th Infantry Division
 U.S. 44th Air Division

 45th Division 
 German 45th Landwehr Division
 German 45th Reserve Division
 45th Rifle Division (Soviet Union)
 British 45th Infantry Division
 U.S. 45th Air Division
 U.S. 45th Infantry Division

 46th Division 
 British 46th Infantry Division
 Imperial German 46th Landwehr Division
 Imperial German 46th Reserve Division
 German 46th Infantry Division

 47th Division 
 British 47th (1/2nd London) Division
 Imperial Landwehr 47th Reserve Division
 Imperial German 47th Reserve Division
 Italian 47th Infantry Division
 U.S. 47th Air Division
 U.S. 47th Infantry Division

 48th Division 
 Imperial Landwehr 48th Reserve Division
 Imperial German 48th Reserve Division
 Italian 48th Infantry Division
 48th Armored Division (United States Army)
 48th Infantry Division

 49th Division 
 Imperial German 49th Reserve Division
 Italian 49th Infantry Division
 49th Rifle Division (Soviet Union)
 British 49th (West Riding) Infantry Division (World War I and II)
 U.S. 49th Armored Division
 U.S. 49th Infantry Division

 50th Division 
 50th (Northumbrian) Division
 50th (Northumbrian) Infantry Division (World War II)
 Imperial German 50th Infantry Division
 Imperial German 50th Reserve Division
 Italian 50th Infantry Division
 50th Infantry Division (United States)
 50th Armored Division (United States)

51st to 60th 

 51st Division 
 British 51st (Highland) Division (World War I)
 British 51st (Highland) Infantry Division (World War II)
 Imperial German 51st Reserve Division
 Italian 51st Infantry Division
 Japanese 51st Division

 52nd Division 
 British 52nd (Lowland) Division
 Imperial German 52nd Infantry Division
 Imperial German 52nd Reserve Division
 Italian 52nd Motorised Division

 53rd Division 
 French 53rd Infantry Division
 Imperial German 53rd Reserve Division
 Italian 53rd Infantry Division
 53 Division (Sri Lanka)
 British 53rd (Welsh) Division

 54th Division 
 British 54th (East Anglian) Division
 Imperial German 54th Infantry Division
 Imperial German 54th Reserve Division
 Italian 54th Infantry Division

 55th Division 
 British 55th Division:
 55th (West Lancashire) Division (1908-1920)
 55th (West Lancashire) Infantry Division (1920-1945)
 French 55th Infantry Division
 Imperial Japanese 55th Infantry Division
 Italian 55th Infantry Division
 Polish 55th Infantry Division

 56th Division 
 British 56th (1/1st London) Division (World War I)
 British 56th (London) Infantry Division
 German 56th Infantry Division
 Imperial German 56th Infantry Division
 Italian 56th Infantry Division
 Imperial Japanese 56th Division
 Soviet 56th Rifle Division

 57th Division 
 British 57th (2nd West Lancashire) Division
 Italian 57th Infantry Division
 Imperial Japanese 57th Infantry Division
 U.S. 57th Air Division

 58th Division 
 Chinese 58th Division
 Imperial German 58th Infantry Division
 German 58th Infantry Division
 Italian 58th Infantry Division
 Sri Lankan 58th Division
 U.S. 58th Air Division

 59th Division 
 British 59th (Staffordshire) Infantry Division (World War II)
 Chinese 59th Division
 Italian 59th Mountain Infantry Division

 60th Division 
 British 60th (2/2nd London) Division
 Chinese 60th Division
 French 60th Infantry Division
 German 60th Infantry Division
 Italian 60th Infantry Division

61st to 70th 

 61st Division 
British 61st (2nd South Midland) Division - (First World War)
British 61st Infantry Division (Second World War)
French 61st Infantry Division (Second World War)
German 61st Infantry Division (Second World War)
Italian 61st Infantry Division
Soviet 61st Tank Division (Second World War)

 62nd Division 
British 62nd Infantry Division
Italian 62nd Infantry Division
U.S. 62nd Cavalry Division

 63rd Division 
British 63rd (Royal Naval) Division
Italian 63rd Infantry Division
U.S. 63rd Cavalry Division
U.S. 63rd Infantry Division

 64th Division 
German 64th Infantry Division
Italian 64th Infantry Division
Imperial Japanese 64th Infantry Division
Soviet 64th Rifle Division
U.S. 64th Air Division
U.S. 64th Cavalry Division

 65th Division 
British 65th Division
Italian 65th Infantry Division
U.S. 65th Air Division
U.S. 65th Cavalry Division
U.S. 65th Infantry Division

 66th Division 
British 66th Infantry Division (First and Second World Wars)
U.S. 66th Cavalry Division
U.S. 66th Infantry Division

 67th Division 
 67th Guards Rifle Division
 67th (2nd Home Counties) Division (United Kingdom)

 68th Division 
 68th Infantry Division (France)
 68th Infantry Division (Wehrmacht)
 68th (2nd Welsh) Division (United Kingdom)

 69th Division 
 German 69th Infantry Division
 69th (2nd East Anglian) Division (United Kingdom)
 U.S. 69th Air Division
 U.S. 69th Infantry Division

 70th Division 
70th Infantry Division (United Kingdom) (Second World War)
70th Infantry Division (United States)

71st to 80th 

 71st Division 
 71st Infantry Division (France)
 71st Infantry Division (Germany)
 71st Division (United Kingdom)
 71st Infantry Division (United States)

 72nd Division
 72nd Infantry Division (France) 
 72nd Infantry Division (Germany)
 Soviet 72nd Guards Rifle Division
 72nd Division (United Kingdom)
 72nd Infantry Division (United States)

 73rd Division 
 73rd Infantry Division (Wehrmacht)
 73rd Rifle Division (Soviet Union)
 73rd Guards Rifle Division
 73rd Division (United Kingdom)

 74th Division 
 British 74th (Yeomanry) Division
 74th Infantry Division (United States)

 75th Division 
 75th Reserve Division (German Empire)
 75th Infantry Division (Philippine Commonwealth)
 75th Guards Tank Division
 75th Guards Rifle Division
 75th Rifle Division (Soviet Union)
 75th Division (United Kingdom)
 75th Infantry Division (United States)

 76th Division 
 British 76th Infantry Division (Second World War)
 Imperial German 76th Reserve Division
 Soviet 76th Rifle Division
 U.S. 76th Infantry Division

 77th Division 
 British 77th Infantry Division (Second World War)
 Imperial German 77th Reserve Division
 U.S. 77th Infantry Division

 78th Division 
 British 78th Infantry Division (Second World War)
 Imperial German 78th Reserve Division
 German 78th Sturm Division
 U.S. 78th Infantry Division
 78th Rifle Division (Soviet Union)

 79th Division 
 British 79th Armoured Division (Second World War)
 Chinese 79th Division
 Imperial German 79th Reserve Division
 U.S. 79th Infantry Division

 80th Division 
 British 80th Infantry Division
 Chinese 80th Division
 Imperial German 80th Reserve Division
 Israeli 80th Division
 Italian 80th Infantry Division (Airlanding)
 Soviet 80th Rifle Division
 U.S. 80th Infantry Division

81st to 90th 

 81st Division 
 British 81st (West Africa) Division
 Chinese 81st Division
 Imperial German 81st Reserve Division
 U.S. 81st Infantry Division
 81st Rifle Division (Soviet Union)
 81st Guards Motor Rifle Division (Soviet Union)

 82nd Division 
 British 82nd (West Africa) Division
 Imperial German 82nd Reserve Division
 82nd Rifle Division (Soviet Union)
 U.S. 82nd Airborne Division

 83rd Division 
 Imperial German 83rd Infantry Division
 83rd Infantry Division (Wehrmacht) 
 Soviet 83rd Cavalry Division
 U.S. 83rd Infantry Division

 84th Division 
 Imperial German 84th Infantry Division
 U.S. 84th Infantry Division

 85th Division 
 Imperial German 85th Landwehr Division
 85th Infantry Division (Wehrmacht) 
 Soviet 85th Rifle Division
 U.S. 85th Air Division
 U.S. 85th Infantry Division

 86th Division 
 Imperial German 86th Infantry Division
 U.S. 86th Air Division
 U.S. 86th Infantry Division

 87th Division 
 Imperial German 87th Infantry Division
 87th Infantry Division (Wehrmacht)
 Soviet 87th Rifle Division
 U.S. 87th Infantry Division

 88th Division 
 Chinese 88th Division
 Chinese (Nationalist) 88th Division
 Imperial German 88th Infantry Division
 88th Infantry Division (Wehrmacht)
 U.S. 88th Infantry Division

 89th Division 
 Chinese 89th Division
 Imperial German 89th Infantry Division
 89th Infantry Division (Wehrmacht)
 Soviet 89th "Tamanyan" Rifle Division
 U.S. 89th Infantry Division

 90th Division 
 German 90th Light Infantry Division
 Soviet 90th Guards Tank Division
 U.S. 90th Air Division
 U.S. 90th Infantry Division

91st to 100th 

 91st Division 
 91st Infantry Division (German Empire)
 German 91st Infantry Division
 Israeli 91st Division
 U.S. 91st Infantry Division
 U.S. 91st Air Division

 92nd Division 
 92nd Infantry Division (German Empire)
 U.S. 92nd Infantry Division
 Iranian 92nd Armoured Division

 93rd Division 
 93rd Infantry Division (German Empire)
 93rd Infantry Division (Wehrmacht)
 93rd Guards Motor Rifle Division (Soviet Union)
 U.S. 93rd Infantry Division

 94th Division 
 94th Division (People's Republic of China)
 94th Infantry Division (German Empire)
 94th Infantry Division (Wehrmacht)
 94th Guards Rifle Division (Soviet Union)
 U.S. 94th Infantry Division

 95th Division 
 95th Infantry Division (German Empire)
 95th Infantry Division (Wehrmacht)
 95th Rifle Division (Soviet Union)
 U.S. 95th Infantry Division

 96th Division 
 96th Infantry Division (German Empire)
 U.S. 96th Infantry Division
 U.S. 96th Air Division

 97th Division 
 97th Jäger Division (Wehrmacht)
 97th Guards Rifle Division (Soviet Union)
 U.S. 97th Infantry Division

 98th Division 
 98th Infantry Division (Germany)
 Israeli 98th Paratroopers Division
 98th Guards Airborne Division
 U.S. 98th Infantry Division

 99th Division 
 German 99th Light Infantry Division
 Soviet 99th Rifle Division
 U.S. 99th Infantry Division

 100th Division 
 Soviet 100th Guards Rifle Division
 U.S. 100th Infantry Division
 German 100th Light Infantry Division

101st to 110th 

 101st Division 
 French 101st Infantry Division
 Imperial German 101st Infantry Division
 German 101st Jäger Division
 Italian 101st Motorised Division
 U.S. 101st Airborne Division
 101st Rifle Division (Soviet Union)

 102nd Division 
 French 102nd Fortress Division
 German 102nd Infantry Division
 Italian 102nd Motorised Division
 Japanese 102nd Division
 U.S. 102nd Infantry Division

 103rd Division 
 103rd Infantry Division (German Empire)
 Italian 103rd Motorised Division
 U.S. 103rd Infantry Division

 104th Division 
 German 104th Jäger Division
 Italian 104th Motorized Division
 U.S. 104th Infantry Division

 105th Division 
 Imperial German 105th Infantry Division
 Italian 105th Motorised Division
 North Korean 105th Armored Division

 106th Division 
 Imperial Japanese 106th Infantry Division
 106th Guards Airborne Division (Russia)
 U.S. 106th Infantry Division
 
 107th Division 
 Imperial German 107th Infantry Division 
 Soviet 107th Tank Division

 108th Division 
 Imperial German 108th Infantry Division
 108th Division (United States) (Institutional Training)
 
 109th Division 
 109th Infantry Division (France)
 Imperial German 109th Infantry Division
 Japanese 109th Division
 109th Rifle Division (Soviet Union)

 110th Division 
 German 110th Infantry Division
 110th Rifle Division (Red Army)

111th to 120th

 111th Division 
 Imperial German 111th Infantry Division
 111th Infantry Division (Wehrmacht)
 111th Tank Division (Red Army, World War II)

 112th Division 
 Chinese 112th Division
 112th Infantry Division (Wehrmacht)
 112th Guards Rifle Division (Soviet Union, post World War II)
 112th Tank Division (Red Army, World War II)

 113th Division 
 113th Division (People's Republic of China)
 113th Infantry Division (German Empire)
 113th Infantry Division (Wehrmacht)

 114th Division 
 Chinese 114th Division
 German 114th Jäger Division
 Imperial Japanese 114th Division

 115th Division 
 115th Division (People's Republic of China)
 115th Infantry Division (German Empire)
 115th Guards Motor Rifle Division (Soviet Union, post World War II)

 116th Division 
 116th Division (People's Republic of China)
 116th Panzer Division (Wehrmacht)

 117th Division 
 117th Division (People's Republic of China)
 117th Infantry Division (German Empire)
 117th Rifle Division (Soviet Union)

 118th Division 
 118th Division (People's Republic of China)
 118th Jäger Division (Wehrmacht)
 118th Guards Rifle Division (Soviet Union)

 119th Division 
 119th Division (People's Republic of China).
 119th Infantry Division (German Empire).

 120th Division 
 120th Division (People's Republic of China)
 120th Guards Rifle Division (Soviet Union)

121st to 130th

 121st Division 
 Imperial German 121st Infantry Division
 German 121st Infantry Division

 122nd Division 
 German 122nd Infantry Division
 122nd Guards Rifle Division (Soviet Union)

 123rd Division 
 Imperial German 123rd Infantry Division

 124th Division 
 Chinese 124th Infantry Division
 124th Guards Rifle Division (Soviet Union)

 125th Division 
 Chinese 125th Infantry Division
 German 125th Infantry Division

 126th Division 
 Chinese 126th Infantry Division
 German 126th Infantry Division

 127th Division 
 Chinese 127th Infantry Division
127th Motor Rifle Division (Russia)
 127th Machine Gun Artillery Division (Soviet Union)
127th Motor Rifle Division (Soviet Union)

 128th Division 
 128th Guards Rifle Division

 129th Division 
 German 129th Infantry Division

 130th Division 
 German 130th Panzer-Lehr-Division

131st to 140th

 131st Division
 131st Infantry Division (Wehrmacht)
 Italian 131st Armoured Division
 131st Infantry Division (Philippines)
 131st Motor Rifle Division (Soviet Union)

 132nd Division
 Italian 132nd Armoured Division

 133rd Division
 Italian 133rd Division
 133rd Rifle Division (Soviet Union)

 134th Division
 134th Infantry Division (Wehrmacht)
 Italian 134th Armoured Division

 135th Division
 Italian 135th Armoured Cavalry Division

 136th Division
 Italian 136th Armoured Division
 Italian 136th Infantry Division
 136th Rifle Division (Soviet Union)

 137th Division
 137th Infantry Division (Wehrmacht)

 138th Division
 138th Rifle Division (Soviet Union)

 139th Division
 139th Rifle Division (Soviet Union)

 140th Division
 140th Division (Imperial Japanese Army)
 140th Rifle Division (Soviet Union)

141st to 150th

 141st Division 
 German 141st Reserve Division

 142nd Division 
 142nd Division (Imperial Japanese Army)

 143rd Division 
 143rd Division (Imperial Japanese Army)

 144th Division 
 144th Division (Imperial Japanese Army)

 145th Division 
 145th Division (Imperial Japanese Army)

 146th Division 
 146th Division (Imperial Japanese Army)

 147th Division 
 147th Division (Imperial Japanese Army)

 148th Division 
 148th Division (People's Republic of China)
 148th Division (Imperial Japanese Army)
 148th Reserve Division (Wehrmacht)

 149th Division 
 149th Division (People's Republic of China)
 Israeli 149th Division
 149th Division (Imperial Japanese Army)

 150th Division 
 Chinese 150th Division 
 150th Division (Imperial Japanese Army)
 150th Rifle Division (Soviet Union)

151st to 160th 

 151st Division 
 151st Division (Imperial Japanese Army)
 Italian 151st Garrison Division

 152nd Division 
 152nd Division (Imperial Japanese Army)
 Italian 152nd Garrison Division

 153rd Division 
 153rd Division (Imperial Japanese Army)
 Italian 153rd Garrison Division
 153rd Rifle Division (Soviet Union)

 154th Division 
 154th Division (Imperial Japanese Army)
 Italian 154th Garrison Division

 155th Division 
 155th Infantry Division (Wehrmacht)
 155th Reserve Panzer Division (Wehrmacht)
 155th Division (Imperial Japanese Army)
 Italian 155th Garrison Division

 156th Division 
 156th Infantry Division (Wehrmacht)
 156th Division (Imperial Japanese Army)
 Italian 156th Garrison Division

 157th Division 
 157th Infantry Division (France)
 German 157th Mountain Division
 157th Division (Imperial Japanese Army)
 Italian 157th Garrison Division

 158th Division 
 158th Infantry Division (Wehrmacht)
 Italian 158th Garrison Division

 159th Division 
 Italian 159th Garrison Division

 160th Division 
 160th Division (Imperial Japanese Army)

161st to 170th

 161st Division 
 161st Infantry Division (France)
 161st Infantry Division (Wehrmacht)
 161st Division (Imperial Japanese Army)

 162nd Division 
 162nd Infantry Division (Wehrmacht)

 163rd Division 
 163rd Infantry Division (Wehrmacht)

 164th Division 
 164th Infantry Division (Wehrmacht)

 167th Division 
 167th Infantry Division (Wehrmacht)

 168th Division 
 168th Infantry Division (Wehrmacht)

 169th Division 
 169th Infantry Division (Wehrmacht)

 170th Division 
 170th Infantry Division (Wehrmacht)

171st to 180th

 180th Division 
 180th Division (People's Republic of China)

181st to 190th

 181st Division 
 181st Infantry Division (Wehrmacht)

 183rd Division 
 183rd Infantry Division (German Empire)
 German 183rd Volksgrenadier Division

 184th Division 
 Italian 184th Airborne Division
 184th Rifle Division (Soviet Union)

 185th Division 
 185th Infantry Division (German Empire)
 Italian 185th Airborne Division

 187th Division 
 187th Infantry Division (German Empire)

 188th Division 
 German Division Nr. 188

191st to 200th

 192nd Division 
 192nd Infantry Division (German Empire)

 193rd Division 
 193rd Rifle Division (Soviet Union)

 195th Division 
 195th Infantry Division (German Empire)

 196th Division 
 196th Infantry Division (Wehrmacht)

 197th Division 
 197th Infantry Division (German Empire)
 197th Infantry Division (Wehrmacht)

 198th Division 
 198th Infantry Division (Wehrmacht)

 199th Division 
 199th Infantry Division (German Empire)

 200th Division 
 200th Division (National Revolutionary Army)
 200th Infantry Division (German Empire)

201st to 210th

 201st Division 
 201st Infantry Division (German Empire)
 Italian 201st Coastal Division
 201st Division (Imperial Japanese Army)
 201st Motor Rifle Division

 202nd Division 
 202nd Infantry Division (German Empire)
 Italian 202nd Coastal Division
 202nd Division (Imperial Japanese Army)

 203rd Division 
 203rd Infantry Division (German Empire)
 Italian 203rd Coastal Division

 204th Division 
 204th Infantry Division (German Empire)
 Italian 204th Coastal Division

 205th Division 
 205th Infantry Division (German Empire)
 205th Infantry Division (Wehrmacht)
 Italian 205th Coastal Division
 205th Division (Imperial Japanese Army)

 206th Division 
 206th Infantry Division (German Empire)
 206th Infantry Division (Wehrmacht)
 Italian 206th Coastal Division
 206th Division (Imperial Japanese Army)

 207th Division 
 207th Infantry Division (German Empire)
 207th Infantry Division (Wehrmacht)
 Italian 207th Coastal Division

 208th Division 
 208th Infantry Division (German Empire)
 208th Infantry Division (Wehrmacht)
 Italian 208th Coastal Division

 209th Division 
 209th Infantry Division (Wehrmacht)
 Italian 209th Coastal Division
 209th Division (Imperial Japanese Army)

 210th Division 
 Italian 210th Coastal Division

211th to 220th

 211th Division 
 211th Infantry Division (German Empire)
 211th Infantry Division (Wehrmacht)
 Italian 211th Coastal Division

 212th Division 
 212th Infantry Division (German Empire)
 212th Infantry Division (Wehrmacht)
 Italian 212th Coastal Division
 212th Division (Imperial Japanese Army)

 213th Division 
 213th Infantry Division (German Empire)
 213th Infantry Division (Wehrmacht)
 Italian 213th Coastal Division

 214th Division 
 214th Infantry Division (German Empire)
 214th Infantry Division (Wehrmacht)
 Italian 214th Coastal Division
 214th Division (Imperial Japanese Army)

 215th Division 
 215th Infantry Division (German Empire)
 215th Infantry Division (Wehrmacht)
 Italian 215th Coastal Division

 216th Division 
 216th Infantry Division (German Empire)
 216th Infantry Division (Wehrmacht)
 216th Coastal Division (Italy)
 216th Division (Imperial Japanese Army)
 216th Motor Rifle Division (Soviet Union)

 217th Division 
 217th Infantry Division (German Empire)
 217th Infantry Division (Wehrmacht)

 218th Division 
 218th Infantry Division (German Empire)
 218th Infantry Division (Wehrmacht)

 219th Division 
 219th Infantry Division (German Empire)

 220th Division 
 220th Infantry Division (German Empire)
 Italian 220th Coastal Division

221st to 230th

 221st Division 
 221st Infantry Division (German Empire)
 Italian 221st Coastal Division
 221st Division (Imperial Japanese Army)
 221st Security Division (Wehrmacht)

 222nd Division 
 222nd Infantry Division (German Empire)
 Italian 222nd Coastal Division

 223rd Division 
 223rd Infantry Division (German Empire)
 Italian 223rd Coastal Division

 224th Division 
 224th Infantry Division (German Empire)
 Italian 224th Coastal Division

 225th Division 
 225th Infantry Division (German Empire)
 Italian 225th Coastal Division

 226th Division 
 226th Infantry Division (German Empire)
 Italian 226th Coastal Division

 227th Division 
 227th Infantry Division (German Empire)
 Italian 227th Coastal Division

 228th Division 
 228th Infantry Division (German Empire)
 Italian 228th Coastal Division

231st to 240th

 231st Division 
 231st Infantry Division (German Empire)

 232nd Division 
 232nd Infantry Division (German Empire)
 232nd Panzer Division

 233rd Division 
 233rd Infantry Division (German Empire)
 233rd Reserve Panzer Division (Wehrmacht)

 234th Division 
 234th Infantry Division (German Empire)

 235th Division 
 235th Infantry Division (German Empire)

 236th Division 
 236th Infantry Division (German Empire)

 237th Division 
 237th Infantry Division (German Empire)

 238th Division 
 238th Infantry Division (German Empire)

 239th Division 
 239th Infantry Division (German Empire)

 240th Division 
 240th Infantry Division (German Empire)

241st to 250th

 241st Division 
 241st Infantry Division (German Empire)

 242nd Division 
 242nd Infantry Division (German Empire)
 242nd Infantry Division (Wehrmacht)
 242nd Training Centre (Russian Airborne Troops – formerly 4th Guards Airborne Division)

 243rd Division 
 243rd Infantry Division (German Empire)

 245th Division 
 245th Infantry Division (Wehrmacht)
 245th Rifle Division (Soviet Union)
 245th Motor Rifle Division

251st to 260th

 252nd Division 
 Israeli 252nd Armored Division (1973) Yom Kippur War)
 252nd Rifle Division (Soviet Union)

 255th Division 
 255th Infantry Division (German Empire)

261st to 270th

 261st Division 
 261st Rifle Division (Soviet Union)

 267th Division 
 267th Infantry Division (Wehrmacht)

 268th Division 
 268th Infantry Division (Wehrmacht)

 269th Division 
 269th Infantry Division (Wehrmacht)

 270th Division 
 270th Rifle Division (Soviet Union)

271st to 280th

 272nd Division 
 272nd Volksgrenadier Division (Wehrmacht)

 273rd Division 
 German 273rd Reserve Panzer Division

 276th Division 
 276th Volksgrenadier Division (Wehrmacht)

 277th Division 
 277th Infantry Division (Wehrmacht)

 278th Division 
 278th Infantry Division (Wehrmacht)

281st to 290th

 281st Division 
 281st Infantry Division (Wehrmacht)

 284th Division 
 284th Rifle Division (Soviet Union)

 286th Division 
 286th Security Division (Wehrmacht)

 290th Division 
 290th Infantry Division (Wehrmacht)

291st to 300th

 292nd Division 
 German 292nd Infantry Division

 299th Division 
 German 299th Infantry Division

301st and above
 301st Division 
 301st Division (German Empire)
301st Infantry Division (Wehrmacht)
301st Rifle Division (Soviet Union)

 302nd Division 
 302nd Division (German Empire)

 303rd Division 
 303rd Division (German Empire)

 304th Division 
 304th Division (Vietnam)

 305th Division 
 German 305th Infantry Division

 308th Division
 308th Rifle Division (Soviet Union)
 308th Infantry Division (Vietnam)

 312th Division 
 312th Division (Vietnam)

 316th Division
 316th Rifle Division (Soviet Union)
 316th Division (Vietnam)

 317th Division 
 317th Division (Vietnam)

 320th Division 
 320th Division (Vietnam)

 324th Division 
 324th Rifle Division (Soviet Union)
 324th Division (Vietnam)
 
 325th Division 
 325th Division (Vietnam)

 334th Division 
 German 334th Infantry Division
 
 341st Division 
 341st Division (Vietnam)
 
 350th Division 
 350th Division (Vietnam People's Army)

 351st Division 
 351st Artillery-Engineer Division (Vietnam)
 
 383rd Division 
 383rd Rifle Division (Soviet Union)

 395th Division 
 395th Division (Vietnam)

 477th Division 
 477th Rifle Division (Soviet Union)

 538th Division 
 538th Frontier Guard Division (Wehrmacht)

 562nd Division 
 German 562nd Grenadier Division

 840th Division 
 U.S. 840th Air Division

 968th Division 
 968th Division (Vietnam People's Army)

 999th Division 
 German 999th Light Afrika Division

See also
 List of military divisions by name

Military divisions by number
Lists of divisions (military formations)